Bouzié, is a 1996 Franco-Ivorian short film directed by Jacques Trabi and produced by Issa Serge Coelo for Parenthese Films. The film stars Thérèse Sialou, Serge Touvolly, Michel Ibo, and Madeleine Kouassy. The film deals with Zébia, an African working in France, buys a plane ticket to Paris to his mother Bouzié to bring her to France and give her a comfortable life.

The film made its premier on 31 December 1996 in France. The film received positive reviews from critics. In 1997 at the Molodist International Film Festival, the film was nominated for the Best Short Fiction Film. In the same year, the film won the Best Short Film (Fiction) Award at the 15th Panafrican Film and Television Festival of Ouagadougou (FESPACO).

Cast
 Thérèse Sialou
 Serge Touvolly
 Michel Ibo
 Madeleine Kouassy

References

External links 
 

Ivorian drama films
1996 films
1996 drama films
1990s French-language films